General elections were held in Rwanda on 29 September 1969. At the time, the country was a one-party state with MDR-Parmehutu as the sole legal party. Its leader, Grégoire Kayibanda, ran unopposed in the presidential election. Voter turnout was 90.9%.

Electoral system
The 47 members of the National Assembly elections were elected in ten multi-member constituencies. Voters could approve the entire MDR-Parmehutu list, or give a preferential vote to a single candidate.

Results

President

Legislative Assembly

References

Elections in Rwanda
General
Rwanda
Single-candidate elections
Parliament of Rwanda
Presidential elections in Rwanda